Umbayee (ഉമ്പായി; 1950 – 1 August 2018) was an Indian folk musician and composer, associated with the Ghazal genre. Born in Mattancherry, Kerala, Umbayee is known for his unique style of singing. He died on 1 August 2018 in Aluva.

Early years
Umbayee was born in 1950 in Mattanchery near Kochi. His real name was Ibrahim. As a child Umbayee did not have a supportive environment towards music. His father was vehemently opposed to his son being inclined to music. Ultimately Umbayee failed in his exams thereby ending his school life. Seeing his son distracted by music, father packed Ibrahim off to Bombay (now Mumbai) where his (Umbayee's) uncle was a seaman and made him a trainee electrician. Being sent to Bombay was a decision which changed his life. He met Ustad Munawar Ali Khan who accepted Ibrahim as his disciple. Ibrahim studied music with Ustad for about 7 years without any interruption.

Musical influences
Umbayee said "Mattancherry was a melting pot of music. There was music all around. You only had to find it."

Similar to the youth at the time, Ibrahim's inspiration had been Mehboob, who was a natural and enigmatic singer. During those times most of the legendary Hindustani musicians visited Mattancherry. Ibrahim used to be doing odd jobs in Abdul Khader Vakil's house where those musicians stayed. He listened to their discussions and music. According to Umbayee "That was the beginning".

Once he got a chance to listen to Pandit Ravi Shankar and Ustad Alla Rakha ‘live’ at Mattancherry. After which Ibrahim understood what he was capable of other than playing Tabla. He realised "There was so much to learn. What I was doing was childish".

Albums
Akale Mounam Pol
Gazalmaala
Hrudayaraagam
Ithuvare Sakhee Ninne Kaathirunnu
Madhuramee Gaanam
Mehboob
Nandi Pranaya Sakhi Nandi
Orikkal Nee Paranju
Oru Mukham Maathram
Paaduka Saigal Paadoo
Phir Vahee Shyaam
Pranaamam Mehboob Ororma

References

 Rejecting a reality show call : സിനിമയില്‍ പാടാനും റിയാലിറ്റി ഷോയില്‍ വിധികര്‍ത്താവാകാനും ഇല്ല: ഉമ്പായി 
 Umbayee Database : http://malayalasangeetham.info/displayProfile.php?category=singers&artist=Umbayi  

1950 births
2018 deaths
Indian male ghazal singers
Singers from Kochi
Malayali people
Deaths from cancer in India
20th-century Indian male singers
20th-century Indian singers
21st-century Indian male singers
21st-century Indian singers
People from Mattancherry